This is a list of the stations and halts on the Vale of Rheidol Railway,  a  narrow gauge preserved railway line running for  from Aberystwyth on the Mid-Wales coast to Devil's Bridge in the Cambrian Mountains.  The line was opened in 1902 to carry lead from the mines and timber for pit props down to the harbour in Aberystwyth. It has carried passengers since opening.

Route

Leaving this station the line travels eastwards towards the village of Llanbadarn Fawr. Trains towards Devil's Bridge pause here briefly to activate the level crossing before proceeding. A short distance from Llanbadarn, the line passes over the River Rheidol on a timber trestle bridge. The line then passes the Glanyrafon Industrial Estate which has developed over the last 25 years before heading out into open countryside. After    station is reached. There is a passing loop here and a station building. All trains stop here.

Leaving Capel Bangor the line passes the Rheidol Riding Centre before it begins to climb steeply through the woods at Tanyrallt. After about 10 minutes the train reaches  a small country station and request stop. Here locomotives take water from the water column before the train continues on the climb to Aberffrwd.

There is a passing loop here and a station building. All trains stop here. Beyond Aberffrwd the line climbs at a gradient of 1 in 50 all the way to Devil's Bridge. This section of the line is isolated with no road access.

List of stations and halts

References

Bibliography

External links
Vale of Rheidol Railway website

 Vale of Rheidol
Vale of Rheidol Railway stations
Vale of Rheidol Railway